Wilhelm Friedemann Bach (22 November 17101 July 1784) was a German composer and musician. He was the second child and eldest son of Johann Sebastian Bach and Maria Barbara Bach. Despite his acknowledged genius as an organist, improviser and composer, his income and employment were unstable, and he died in poverty.

Life 

Wilhelm Friedemann (hereafter Friedemann) was born in Weimar, where his father was employed as organist and chamber musician to the Duke of Saxe-Weimar. In July 1720, when Friedemann was nine, his mother Maria Barbara Bach died suddenly; Johann Sebastian Bach remarried in December 1721. J. S. Bach supervised Friedemann's musical education and career with great attention. The graded course of keyboard studies and composition that J. S. Bach provided is documented in the Clavier-Büchlein vor Wilhelm Friedemann Bach (modern spelling: Klavierbüchlein für Wilhelm Friedemann Bach), with entries by both father and son. This education also included (parts of) the French Suites, (Two-Part) Inventions, (Three-Part) Sinfonias (popularly known as "Inventions"), the first volume of The Well-Tempered Clavier, and the six Trio Sonatas for organ. At the age of 16 he went to Merseburg to learn the violin with his teacher Johann Gottlieb Graun.

In addition to his musical training, Friedemann received formal schooling beginning in Weimar. When J. S. Bach took the post of Cantor of the St. Thomas Church in Leipzig (in 1723), he enrolled Friedemann in the associated Thomasschule. (J. S. Bach—who had himself been orphaned at the age of 10—said that he took the position in Leipzig partly because of the educational opportunities it afforded his children). On graduating in 1729, Friedemann enrolled as a law student in Leipzig University, a renowned institution at the time, but later moved on to study law and mathematics at the University of Halle. 
He maintained a lifelong interest in mathematics, and continued to study it privately during his first job in Dresden.

Friedemann was appointed in 1733 to the position of organist of the St. Sophia's Church at Dresden. In competing for the post he played a new version of his father's Prelude and Fugue in G Major, BWV 541. The judge described Friedemann as clearly superior to the other two candidates. He remained a renowned organist throughout his life. Among his many pupils in Dresden was Johann Gottlieb Goldberg, the keyboardist whose name is erroneously enshrined in the popular nickname given to J. S. Bach's 1742 publication, "Aria with Diverse Variations"—that is, "The Goldberg Variations." The scholar Peter Williams has discredited the story which links the work to Goldberg stating that J. S. Bach wrote the work for the Russian Ambassador Count Hermann Carl von Keyserlingk, who would ask his employee, Goldberg, to play variations for him to ward off insomnia. Williams instead has argued that J. S. Bach wrote the variations to provide a display piece for Friedemann.

In 1746 Friedemann became organist of the Liebfrauenkirche at Halle. 
In 1751, Friedemann married Dorothea Elisabeth Georgi (1721–1791), who was 11 years his junior and who outlived him by seven years. Dorothea was the daughter of a tax collector. The landed estates she inherited caused the family to be placed in a high tax bracket by Halle authorities, who were raising taxes to meet the revenue demands of the Seven Years' War. To raise cash for these payments, she sold part of her property in 1770. The couple produced two sons and a daughter, Friederica Sophia (born in 1757), who was the only one of their offspring to live past infancy. The descendants of Friederica Sophia eventually migrated to Oklahoma.

Friedemann was deeply unhappy in Halle almost from the beginning of his tenure. In 1749 he was involved in a conflict with the Cantor of the Liebfrauenkirche, Gottfried Mittag, who had misappropriated funds that were due to Friedemann. In 1750 the church authorities reprimanded Friedemann for overstaying a leave of absence (he was in Leipzig settling his father's estate). In 1753 he made his first documented attempt to find another post, and thereafter made several others. All these attempts failed. Bach had at least two pupils, Friedrich Wilhelm Rust and Johann Samuel Petri.

In 1762, he negotiated for the post of Kapellmeister to the court of Darmstadt; although he protracted the negotiations for reasons that are opaque to historians and did not actively take the post, he nevertheless was appointed Hofkapellmeister of Hessen-Darmstadt, a title he used in the dedication of his Harpsichord Concerto in E minor.

In June 1764, Friedemann left the job in Halle without any employment secured elsewhere. His financial situation deteriorated so much that in 1768 he re-applied for his old job in Halle, without success. He thereafter supported himself by teaching. After leaving Halle in 1770, he lived for several years (1771–1774) in Braunschweig where he applied in vain for the post of an organist at the St. Catherine's church. Then he moved to Berlin, where he initially was welcomed by the princess Anna Amalia (the sister of Frederick the Great). Later, no longer in favor at court, he gave harpsichord lessons to Sarah Itzig Levy, the daughter of a prominent Jewish family in Berlin and an avid collector of Bach and other early 18th century music, who was also a "patron" of Friedemann's brother CPE Bach. Friedemann died in Berlin.

Earlier biographers have concluded that his "wayward" and difficult personality reduced his ability to gain and hold secure employment, but the scholar David Schulenberg writes (in the Oxford Composer Companion: J.S. Bach, ed. Malcolm Boyd, 1999) that "he may also have been affected by changing social conditions that made it difficult for a self-possessed virtuoso to succeed in a church- or court-related position" (p. 39). Schulenberg adds, "he was evidently less willing than most younger contemporaries to compose fashionable, readily accessible music".

Friedemann Bach was renowned for his improvisatory skills. It is speculated that when in Leipzig his father's accomplishments set so high a bar that he focused on improvisation rather than composition. Evidence adduced for this speculation includes the fact that his compositional output increased in Dresden and Halle.

Friedemann's compositions include many church cantatas and instrumental works, of which the most notable are the fugues, polonaises and fantasias for clavier, and the duets for two flutes. He incorporated more elements of the contrapuntal style learned from his father than any of his three composer brothers, but his use of the style has an individualistic and improvisatory edge which endeared his work to musicians of the late 19th century, when there was something of a revival of his reputation.

Friedemann's students included Johann Nikolaus Forkel, who in 1802 published the first biography of Johann Sebastian Bach; Friedemann, as well as his younger brother Carl Philipp Emanuel Bach, were major informants for Forkel. Friedemann has in earlier biographies been called a poor custodian of his father's musical manuscripts, many of which he inherited; however, more recent scholars are uncertain how many were lost. It is known that Friedemann sold some of his father's collection to raise cash to pay debts (including a large sale in 1759 to Johann Georg Nacke). Also, his daughter took some of the Sebastian Bach manuscripts with her when she moved to America, and these were passed on to her descendants, who inadvertently destroyed many of them. Others were passed on through his only known Berlin pupil, Sarah Itzig Levy, great-aunt of Felix Mendelssohn. Some of his scores were collected by Carl Friedrich Christian Fasch and his pupil Carl Friedrich Zelter, the teacher of Felix Mendelssohn and through them these materials were placed in the library of the Sing-Akademie zu Berlin, which Fasch founded in 1791 and of which Zelter took charge in 1800.

Friedemann is known occasionally to have claimed credit for music written by his father, but this was in keeping with common musical practices in the era.

Works
"BR-WFB" denotes "Bach-Repertorium Wilhelm Friedemann Bach". "Fk." denotes "Falck catalogue". Bach Digital Work (BDW) pages contain information about individual compositions.

More lost, doubtful and spurious works

 Fk. 34 – Fugue in B-flat major: not by any Bach family member
 Fk. 66 – Sinfonia in D minor: spurious
 Fk. 101–105 – lost cantatas
 Orchestral Suite in G Minor, BWV 1070 (possibly spurious)
 Scherzo in D minor, BWV 844, attributed to both W. F. and J. S. Bach.

Reception

Use by later composers

Wolfgang Amadeus Mozart's set of six Preludes and Fugues for string trio, K. 404a, contains five fugues transcribed from The Well-Tempered Clavier by Johann Sebastian Bach while the sixth fugue in F minor, is a transcription of one of the Eight Fugues (Falck 31) of Wilhelm Friedemann Bach.  The preludes in K. 404a are Mozart's own, except for 4 (from BWV 527) and 5 (second movement from BWV 526).

Film

Friedemann Bach is a 1941 German historical drama film directed by Traugott Müller and starring Gustaf Gründgens, Leny Marenbach and Johannes Riemann. The film depicts the life of Johann Sebastian Bach's son Wilhelm Friedemann Bach. It is based on Albert Emil Brachvogel's novel Friedemann Bach. Wilhelm Friedemann Bach is shown as a gifted son trying to escape his father's shadow.

Notes

References

Sources

Applegate, Celia, Bach in Berlin: Nation and Culture in Mendelssohn's Revival of the St. Mathew Passion, Cornell University Press, Ithaca and London, 2005, 
The New Grove Dictionary served as a source for revision.
Schulenberg, David: entry on Wilhelm Friedemann Bach in The Oxford Composer Companion: J.S.Bach (ed. Malcolm Boyd,)
The harpsichord concertos of Wilhelm Friedemann Bach

Further reading
Borysenko, Elena. The Cantatas of Wilhelm Friedemann Bach. Thesis (Ph.D.) Eastman School of Music, University of Rochester, 1981. In 2 volumes. ("Vol. II ... consists primarily of selected movements from the cantatas of W.F. Bach, followed by translations of the texts of these movements and a critical commentary.")
Falck, Martin. Wilhelm Friedemann Bach; Sein Leben und seine Werke, mit thematischem Verzeichnis seiner Kompositionen und zwei Bildern. Leipzig: C. F. Kahnt, 1919.
Helm, Eugene. "Wilhelm Friedemann Bach", in Christoph Wolff et al., The New Grove Bach Family. NY: Norton, 1983, pp. 238–50.
 Kahmann, Ulrich. Wilhelm Friedemann Bach. Der unterschätzte Sohn. Bielefeld: Aisthesis, 2010.
WF Bach - the neglected son Biography, major works and recommended recordings. Gramophone, April 2010
 Schulenberg, David. The Music of Wilhelm Friedemann Bach. Rochester: University of Rochester Press, 2010.
 Daniel Hensel: Wilhelm Friedemann Bach. Epigone oder Originalgenie, verquere Erscheinung oder großer Komponist?; Stuttgart: ibidem, April 2011,

External links

Concertos, harpsichords (2), orchestra, F. 46, E major, arranged for two pianos (from the Sibley Music Library Digital Score Collection)

1710 births
1784 deaths
Wilhelm Friedemann
German male classical composers
German Baroque composers
German Lutherans
Musicians from Weimar
People educated at the St. Thomas School, Leipzig
Leipzig University alumni
18th-century classical composers
18th-century German male musicians
Pupils of Johann Sebastian Bach